The 2012–13 Northern Counties East Football League season was the 31st in the history of Northern Counties East Football League, a football competition in England.

Premier Division

The Premier Division featured 19 clubs which competed in the previous season, along with three new clubs:
Glasshoughton Welfare, promoted from Division One
Heanor Town, promoted from the East Midlands Counties League
Worksop Parramore, promoted from Division One

From this league, seven teams - Bridlington Town, Brighouse Town, Long Eaton United, Scarborough Athletic, Staveley Miners Welfare, Tadcaster Albion and Worksop Parramore - applied for promotion.

League table

Results

Locations

Division One

Division One featured 17 clubs which competed in the previous season, along with five new clubs:
Athersley Recreation, promoted from the Sheffield and Hallamshire County Senior League
Cleethorpes Town, promoted from the Lincolnshire League
Clipstone Welfare, promoted from the Central Midlands League
Knaresborough Town, promoted from the West Yorkshire League
Selby Town, relegated from the Premier Division

League table

Results

References

External links
 Northern Counties East Football League

2012-13
9